Milda is a genus of sea snails, marine gastropod mollusks in the family Pyramidellidae, the pyrams and their allies.

Species
Species within the genus Milda include:
 Milda cincta (Reeve, 1842)
 Milda garretti (Tryon, 1886)
 Milda ogasawarazimana (Nomura, 1939)
 Milda ventricosa (Guérin, 1831)

Description
The umbilicated shell is elongate conic. It increases regularly in size with three folds on the columella. The basal fasciole is present. The surface is less polished than in Pyramidella. It is marked by lines of growth and microscopic spiral striations.

References

External links
 To World Register of Marine Species

Pyramidellidae